Veggio is an Italian surname. Notable people with the surname include:

Andrea Veggio (born 1923), Italian Roman Catholic bishop
Claudio Veggio (born c. 1510), Italian Renaissance composer

Italian-language surnames
Surnames of Italian origin